BBC Film (formerly BBC Films) is the feature film-making arm of the BBC. It was founded on 18 June 1990, and has produced or co-produced some of the most successful British films of recent years, including Truly, Madly, Deeply, Alan Partridge: Alpha Papa, Quartet, Salmon Fishing in the Yemen, Saving Mr. Banks, My Week with Marilyn, Mr. Magorium's Wonder Emporium, Eastern Promises, Match Point, Jane Eyre, In the Loop, An Education, StreetDance 3D, Fish Tank, The History Boys, Nativity!, Iris, Notes on a Scandal,  Philomena, Stan & Ollie, Man Up, Billy Elliot and Brooklyn.

BBC Film co-produces around eight films a year, working in partnership with major international and UK distributors. Rose Garnett is Head of BBC Film, responsible for the development and production slate, strategy and business operations.

The company was founded in 1990 by David M. Thompson as a wholly owned but independent film-making company, based in offices in Mortimer Street, London. A restructuring in 2007 integrated it into the main BBC Fiction department of BBC Vision. As a result, it moved out of its independent offices into BBC Television Centre, and Thompson left to start his own film production company. BBC Film has been based at Broadcasting House in London since 2013. The company changed its name to BBC Film in 2020, and it has been announced that the Storyville documentary strand has come under its remit.

Productions

1990's
 1990 – Truly, Madly, Deeply
 1990 – Antonia and Jane (with Miramax Films)
 1991 – Enchanted April
 1991 – Edward II
 1991 – The Reflecting Skin
 1992 – Sarafina!
 1993 – The Hawk
 1993 – The Snapper
 1994 – Captives (with Miramax Films & Distant Horizon)
 1994 – The Hour of the Pig
 1995 – I.D.
 1995 – Angus
 1996 – Jude
 1996 – Small Faces
 1996 – Twelfth Night: Or What You Will
 1996 – Shine
 1997 – Twenty Four Seven
 1997 – I Went Down
 1997 – My Son the Fanatic
 1997 – Love and Death on Long Island
 1997 – Mrs Dalloway
 1997 – Mrs Brown
 1998 – Gods and Monsters
 1998 – Hard Rain
 1998 – A Simple Plan
 1998 – Black Dog
 1998 – The Governess
 1998 – Love is the Devil: Study for a Portrait of Francis Bacon
 1999 – RKO 281
 1999 – A Room for Romeo Brass
 1999 – Mansfield Park
 1999 – Man on the Moon

2000
 Wonder Boys
 Wild About Harry
 Saltwater
 Maybe Baby
 Billy Elliot (with Working Title Films)
 Shadow of the Vampire (with Saturn Films)
 Isn't She Great
 Last Resort

2001
 Iris (with Miramax Films and Intermedia Films)
 Born Romantic
 About Adam
 The Claim
 Lara Croft: Tomb Raider

2002
 The Gathering Storm
 Anita and Me
 Dirty Pretty Things
 In This World

2003
 The Statement
 Kiss of Life
 The Mother
 Skagerrak
 Masked and Anonymous
 Code 46
 I Capture The Castle
 Deep Blue
 Lara Croft: Tomb Raider – The Cradle of Life

2004
 Undone (short)
 The Accidental Perfectionist
 Bullet Boy
 Millions
 Red Dust
 My Summer of Love
 The Life and Death of Peter Sellers (with Company Pictures)
 Stage Beauty (with Qwerty Films and Tribeca Film)
 Trauma

2005
 The Undertaker (short)
 Opal Dream
 Imagine Me & You
 Mrs Henderson Presents
 A Cock and Bull Story
 Match Point
 Shooting Dogs  (co-production with UK Film Council)
 Love + Hate
 The Mighty Celt

2006
 Notes on a Scandal
 Starter for Ten
 Scoop
 Shiny Shiny Bright New Hole in My Heart
 Fast Food Nation
 The History Boys
 Confetti
 Shoot the Messenger
 Miss Potter
 As You Like It (in association with HBO Films)
 Glastonbury
 Snow Cake
 Life and Lyrics

2007
 Joe's Palace
 The Restraint of Beasts
 Four Last Songs
 Capturing Mary
 Eastern Promises (distributed and co-presented by Focus Features)
 Becoming Jane
 Earth (co-production with Disneynature)
 Grow Your Own

2008
 Churchill at War
 Revolutionary Road (co-production with DreamWorks Pictures)
 Death Defying Acts
 The Duchess
 Brideshead Revisited
 The Boy in the Striped Pyjamas
 The Other Boleyn Girl
 The Edge of Love
 The Meerkats
 Is Anybody There?
 Man On Wire (as BBC Storyville)
 Shifty
 Easy Virtue

2009
 Nativity!
 The Men Who Stare at Goats
 Tormented
 Frequently Asked Questions About Time Travel
 The Damned United (co-production with Columbia Pictures)
 In the Loop
 Bright Star (co-production with Warner Bros., Pathé, Film Finance Corporation Australia, Pathé, UK Film Council, and Screen Australia)
 The Boys Are Back (co-production with Miramax Films, Film Finance Corporation Australia, Tiger Aspect Pictures, and Screen Australia)
 An Education
 Fish Tank
 Creation
 Glorious 39

2010
 The First Grader (co-production with National Geographic Entertainment, Videovision Entertainment, & UK Film Council)
 Made in Dagenham
 Tamara Drewe
 Edge of Darkness (co-production with Warner Bros. and Icon Productions)
 StreetDance 3D (co-production with Phase 4 Films, Vertigo Films, & British Film Institute)
 Freestyle (co-production with Phase 4 Films, Revolver Entertainment, Film London Microwave, B19 Media, and UK Film Council)
 Africa United

2011
 The Awakening
 Brighton Rock
 West Is West
 Jane Eyre
 Coriolanus
 My Week with Marilyn
 Project Nim
 The Iron Lady
 Salmon Fishing in the Yemen
 We Need to Talk about Kevin
 One Life (as BBC Earth Films)
 The British Guide to Showing Off
 Ill Manors

2012
 Quartet
 Shadow Dancer
 Spike Island
 Blood
 Good Vibrations
 Great Expectations
 In the Dark Half
 A Running Jump
 StreetDance 2
 Strawberry Fields (co-production with Soda Pictures, Film London Microwave, Kent County Council Film Office, Screen South, Met Film Post, and UK Film Council)

2013
 Philomena
 Saving Mr. Banks (co-production with Walt Disney Pictures)
 Dom Hemingway
 Alan Partridge: Alpha Papa
 Walking with Dinosaurs: The Movie (as BBC Earth Films)
 Broken
 Exhibition
 Flying Blind (co-production with Soda Pictures, iFeatures, Matador Pictures, Southwest Screen, Cinema Six, Regent Capital, The City of Bristol and Ignition Films)
 Borrowed Time (co-production with Film London Microwave, UK Film Council and Parkville Pictures)
 The Challenger Disaster
 Big Men
 Ginger & Rosa
 Now Is Good
 London: The Modern Babylon (co-production with Cinedigm, British Film Institute and Nitrate Film)
 The Summit
 The Sea
 Kiss the Water (co-production with Easy There Tiger, Slate Films, and Creative Scotland)

2014
 Mrs. Brown's Boys D'Movie
 A Little Chaos
 A Long Way Down
 The Invisible Woman
 What We Did on Our Holiday
 Enchanted Kingdom (as BBC Earth Films, co-production with Reliance Entertainment, IM Global, & Evergreen Studios)
 Pride
 My Old Lady
 Lilting

2015
 Far from the Madding Crowd
 The Falling
 Woman in Gold
 Suite Française
 Testament of Youth
 Mr. Holmes
 X+Y
 Bill
 Brooklyn
 The Lady in the Van
 Man Up
 London Road

2016
 David Brent: Life on the Road
 Absolutely Fabulous: The Movie
 Florence Foster Jenkins
 Swallows and Amazons
 Denial
 My Scientology Movie
 A United Kingdom
 The Lovers and the Despot (as BBC Storyville)
 The Levelling
 Notes on Blindness
 I, Daniel Blake
 The Library Suicides (co-production with Soda Pictures, Edicis Films, S4C, Ffilm Cymru Wales and British Film Institute)
 The Lighthouse

2017
 Viceroy's House
 City of Tiny Lights
 The Sense of an Ending
 Their Finest
 Lady Macbeth
 Victoria & Abdul
 Mindhorn
 Breathe
 Earth: One Amazing Day (as BBC Earth Films, co-production with Goldcrest Films International & SMG Pictures)
 Apostasy
 Spaceship (co-production with Breaking Glass Pictures, iFeatures, Creative England, British Film Institute, Belly Productions, Parkville Pictures, and Trinity)

2018
 On Chesil Beach
 Yardie
 The Children Act
 The Happy Prince
 Out of Blue
 In Fabric
 Happy New Year, Colin Burstead
 Grace Jones: Bloodlight and Bami

2019
 Blue Story
 Dirty God
 Little Joe
 Stan & Ollie
 Sorry We Missed You
 Horrible Histories: The Movie – Rotten Romans
 The Aftermath
 The Boy Who Harnessed the Wind
 The Souvenir
 The White Crow
 Monsoon
 Judy

2020
 Never Rarely Sometimes Always
 The Nest
 Surge
 His House
 Mogul Mowgli
 Misbehaviour
 The Roads Not Taken
 Ammonite
 Supernova
 Lynn + Lucy

2021
 After Love
 The Mauritanian
 Can't Get You Out of My Head (TV series)
 People Just Do Nothing: Big in Japan
 Ear for Eye
 The Power of the Dog
 Pirates
 The Souvenir Part II
 The Phantom of the Open

2022
 Aisha
 Ali & Ava
 Benediction
 God's Creatures
 Aftersun
 Triangle of Sadness
 The Lost King
 Allelujah
 The Eternal Daughter
 Russia 1985-1999: TraumaZone (TV series)
 Cow

2023
 Girl
 Luther: The Fallen Sun
 Medusa Deluxe
 Rye Lane
 Scrapper

Forthcoming 
 The End We Start From
 The Iron Claw
 Tuesday

See also

 BBC

References

External links
 

BBC
Film production companies of the United Kingdom
BAFTA Outstanding British Contribution to Cinema Award